DXBZ may refer to:
 DXBZ-AM, an AM radio station broadcasting in Pagadian, branded as Radyo Bagting
 DXBZ-FM, an FM radio station broadcasting in Davao de Oro, branded as YK FM